Aud Blattmann (born 26 September 1937 in Kristiansand) is a Norwegian politician for the Labour Party.

She was elected to the Norwegian Parliament from Vest-Agder in 1985, and was re-elected on three occasions. She had previously served in the position of deputy representative during the term 1981–1985.

References

1937 births
Living people
Labour Party (Norway) politicians
Politicians from Kristiansand
Members of the Storting
Women members of the Storting
21st-century Norwegian politicians
21st-century Norwegian women politicians
20th-century Norwegian politicians
20th-century Norwegian women politicians